Lotfollah Meysami is an Iranian Nationalist-Religious activist, journalist and publisher.

He owns and publishes Cheshmandāz-e Irān, a two-monthly magazine on politics and strategy.

Political activity 
Meisami was a student activist with the National Front and Freedom Movement of Iran while studying at the University of Tehran. After graduation, he secured a job and could make a stable future for himself, but he chose to join the People's Mujahedin of Iran (MEK) to engage in the guerilla movement against the Pahlavy dynasty. Meisami was blinded by a self-made bomb and also lost a hand.

He was sentenced to imprisonment multiple times, from winter 1963 to summer 1964 at Qasr Prison for his association with the Freedom Movement of Iran, and between summer 1971 and 1973 at Evin Prison and 1974 to 1979 for his activities with the MEK. He left the MEK following its ideological shift to Marxism. He then founded an organization in 1976/77, namely People's Mujahedin Movement of Iran.

References

 Biography on official website

Living people
1942 births
National Front (Iran) student activists
Freedom Movement of Iran politicians
Early People's Mojahedin Organization of Iran members
Iranian religious-nationalists
Iranian publishers (people)
Iranian journalists
Iranian engineers
Petroleum engineers
Iranian blind people
Blind politicians
Blind writers
Blind activists
University of Tehran alumni
Iranian revolutionaries
Iranian amputees
Iranian politicians with disabilities
Members of the National Council for Peace
Imperial Iranian Army conscripted personnel